Far East Model Car Association (FEMCA) is the governing body of radio-controlled car racing in Asia and Australasia. It is one of the four member blocs to be entitled to full voting rights within.

The organisation was founded in 1980, based in Hong Kong; after two false starts, it was re-established in 1985 when it hosted its first IFMAR race in Tokyo.

Member countries

References

External links

Sports governing bodies in Asia
Sports governing bodies in Australia
Radio-controlled car racing organizations
1980 establishments in Australia
Sports organizations established in 1980
Hobbyist organizations